FC Zbrojovka Brno was a Czech women's football team from Brno, representing FC Zbrojovka Brno in the Czech Second Division. It was founded in 2006. Since its establishment, the club's best finish in the First Division is fourth, which it achieved in 2007–08 and 2009–10.

Honours
In the Czech Republic
 Moravian Football League (2): 2013-14, 2014–15

Previous seasons
In the 2012-13 season, team relegated into the Moravian Football League. In the 2016-17 season, team promoted back into the Czech First Division due to FK Bohemians Prague not signed to the Czech First Division.

 2006–2013 Czech First Division
 2013–2015 Moravian Football League
 2015–2016 Czech Second Division
 2016–2017 Czech First Division
 2017–2018 Czech Second Division

Last squad

References

Women's football clubs in the Czech Republic
Defunct football clubs in the Czech Republic
Association football clubs established in 2006
Association football clubs disestablished in 2018
 
2006 establishments in the Czech Republic
2018 disestablishments in the Czech Republic